Devaryamjal a village in Medchal-Malkajgiri District near Hyderabad, Telangana, India. It falls under Shamirpet mandal. The village is one of the biggest villages in the mandal. It is close to Hakimpet village.

References

Villages in Ranga Reddy district